Jackie Slack  (born 25 July 1959) is a British former footballer who played as a left back for the England women's national football team, playing 32 matches and scoring one goal. She was part of the team at the 1987 Women's EURO and  1991 Women's EURO.

Honours

Player

Lowestoft
FA Women's Cup: 1982

Norwich
FA Women's Cup: 1986

References

1959 births
Living people
English women's footballers
England women's international footballers
Place of birth missing (living people)
Women's association football defenders
Lowestoft Ladies F.C. players